Ali Mechiche (born 29 March 1958) is an Algerian football manager.

References

1958 births
Living people
Algerian football managers
ES Sétif managers
JS Saoura managers
USM Bel Abbès managers
JSM Skikda managers
CA Batna managers
MC El Eulma managers
Algerian Ligue Professionnelle 1 managers
21st-century Algerian people